Muhammad Imin khan

Muhammad Imin Khan or Muhammad Mu' min was khan of Tufan from 1694-1705. Khan was a direct descendant Chagatai Khan, son of Genghis Khan. He was the third younger brother of Abd ar-Rashid Khan II and was grand son of Ismail Khan (Moghul khan). He tried to restore the chagatai dynasty of Yarkand.

Afaq Khoja died in 1694 and was succeeded in Kashger by his son Yahya Khoja (r. 1694-1695). After Yahya Khoja's death (he was killed by Apak Khoja's wife Khanam Padshah) the Yarkand Khan Muhammad Imin (Akbash Khan, r. 1695-1706) restored the Chagatay dynasty of Yarkand, but the Begs of Kashgar refused to acknowledge him and they allied with Kyrgyz to attack Yarkand, taking Muhammad Mu' min prisoner, in attempting to get rid of the Dzungar mandate, but finally he was killed by Kyrgyz leader Arzu Muhammad. Following this, in response to request by Yarkand begs, the Dzungar troops marched southward to drive out the Kyrgyz. Yrakand was given over to Mirza Alim Shah Beg and the Chaghatai line of khans finally ended. Kashgaria was soon reconquered by Dzungar Khan Tsewang Rabtan.

References 

Chagatai khans